Yaychi (also Romanized as Yāychī) is a village in Baba Jik Rural District, in the Central District of Chaldoran County, West Azerbaijan Province, Iran. At the 2006 census, its population was 46, in 10 families.

References 

Populated places in Chaldoran County